Borislav Stoyanov (born 13 February 1985) is a Bulgarian footballer currently playing for SG Pertolzhofen/Niedermurach in the Kreisliga West in the region Cham/Schwandorf as a goalkeeper.

Career
He started playing football at Iskar Druzhba, before moving to Lokomotiv Sofia. Between 2006–08 he played for  Belasitsa Petrich. Then he joined Malesh Mikrevo. In 2010, Stoyanov was a major contributor to Malesh Mikrevo's  promotion to B PFG. In this season, he achieved a record of 11 straight clean sheets.
During the 2010–11 season, he played for Akademik Sofia in six league matches and one match in the Bulgarian Cup.
For the 2011–12 season, he moved to Nesebar.
In July 2012, he played for FK Bregalnica Štip. 
For the 2013–14 season, he moved to Slivnishki geroi.
For the 2014–15 season, he signed with SV Schwarzhofen in Germany.
Since 2015 he moved to Futsal Club TV Wackersdorf and will play at the highest level of futsal in Germany Futsal-Regionalliga Süd. 
For the 2019–20 season, he moved to SG Pertolzhofen/Niedermurach to play with his Futsal Club TV Wackersdorf  teammates Stoyan Stoykov and Aleksandar Mitushev .

In 2020, he left the team of Futsal ClubTV Wackersdorf and remains to play only football in SG Pertolzhofen/Niedermurach.
On July 25, 2021, in a match of the second round, he suffered a serious injury, tearing his Achilles tendon on his left leg.

On 17.07.2022, almost a year after his injury, he returned to the field in an official match in the local derby against Dieterskirchen.

International career
In December 2019, Stoyanov earned his first call-up to the Bulgaria national side for a friendly match against Moldova .

Honours 

South-West V AFG
Champions 2009–10
Runner-Up  2008–09
Best Goalkeeper 2009-10
'''Kreisklase Nord
Champions 2019–21
Best Goalkeeper 2019-21

References

Living people
1985 births
Footballers from Sofia
Bulgarian footballers
Bulgarian expatriate footballers
FC Malesh Mikrevo players
PFC Belasitsa Petrich players
Akademik Sofia players
PFC Nesebar players
FK Bregalnica Štip players
First Professional Football League (Bulgaria) players
Expatriate footballers in North Macedonia
Association football goalkeepers